The Ngoni people are an ethnic group living in the present-day Southern African countries of Malawi, Mozambique, Tanzania, Zimbabwe, and Zambia. The Ngoni trace their origins to the Nguni and Zulu people of kwaZulu-Natal in South Africa. The displacement of the Ngoni people in the great scattering following the Zulu wars had repercussions in social reorganization as far north as Malawi and Zambia.

History

The rise of the Zulu nation to dominance in southern Africa in the early nineteenth century (~1815–~1840) disrupted many traditional alliances. Around 1817, the Mthethwa alliance, which included the Zulu clan, came into conflict with the Ndwandwe alliance, which included the Nguni people from what is now kwaZulu-Natal. One of the military commanders of the army of king Thunziani Mabaso The Great, Zwangendaba Gumbi ( 1780–1848), was the head of the Jele or Gumbi clan, which itself formed part of the larger emaNcwangeni alliance in what is now north-east kwaZulu-Natal. In 1819, the Zulu army under Mabaso defeated the Ndwandwe alliance at a battle on the Mhlathuze River, near Nkandla. The battle resulted in the diaspora of many indigenous groups in southern Africa.

The long migration north
In the following decades, Zwangendaba led a small group of his followers north through Mozambique and Zimbabwe to the region around the Viphya Plateau. In this region, present-day Zambia (Chipata district), Malawi (Mzimba, Ntcheu and Karonga district) and Tanzania (Matema district), he established a state, using Zulu warfare techniques to conquer and integrate local peoples.

The date on which Zwengandaba's party crossed the Zambezi river, sometimes given in early writings as 1825, has been argued to have been on 20 November 1835.

Following Zwangendaba's death in 1848, succession disputes split the Ngoni people. Zwangendaba's following and the Maseko Ngoni eventually created seven substantial Ngoni kingdoms in Tanzania, Zambia and Malawi.

While the Ngoni were primarily agriculturalists, cattle were their main goal for raiding expeditions and migrations northward. Their reputation as refugees escaping Shaka is easily overstated; it is thought that no more than 1,000 Ngoni crossed the Zambezi river in the 1830s. They raided north, taking women in marriage and men into their fighting regiments. Their prestige became so great that by 1921, in Nyasaland alone, 245,833 people claimed membership as Ngoni although few spoke the Zulu dialect called Ngoni. The Ngoni integrated conquered subjects into their warfare and organization, becoming more a ruling class than an ethnic group, and by 1906 few individuals were of pure Ngoni descent. Only after Ngoni status began to decline did the tribal consciousness of the component groups began to rise, along with their reported numbers. In the early 1930s the Ngonde, Nyasa, Tonga and other groups once again claimed their original tribal status.

Present

While the Ngoni have generally retained a distinct identity in the post-colonial states in which they live, integration and acculturation has led to them adopting local languages; nowadays the Zulu language is used only for a few ritual praise poems and songs.

The Ngoni people of Zambia

Mpezeni (also spelt Mpeseni) was the warrior-king of one of the largest Ngoni groups, based in what is now the Chipata District of Zambia, and was courted by the Portuguese and British. The British South Africa Company of Cecil Rhodes sent agents to obtain a treaty—Alfred Sharpe in 1889, and Joseph Maloney in 1895, who were both unsuccessful.

In 1897, with over 4,000 warriors, Mpezeni rose up against the British, who were taking control of Nyasaland and North-Eastern Rhodesia, and was defeated. Mpezeni signed the treaty which allowed him to rule as Paramount Chief of the Ngoni in Zambia's Eastern Province and Malawi's Mchinji district. His successors as chief take the title Paramount Chief Mpezeni to this day.

The cruelty and ruthlessness of Mpezeni's raids can be understood from this account written by a British hunter who came across a Chewa village a few hours after a raid in 1897:

On my arrival I found the male population all under arms, and the women crying. A raiding party of Mpezeni’s people had attacked them suddenly that morning. Ten women were killed in the gardens and twenty-two were taken away as prisoners. An old man and one of the headman’s children had been severely wounded. Their entrails hung out of frightfully torn wounds, inflicted most likely by barbed spears. It was a pitiful sight — the groans of the wounded, the women crying over their dead, whose bodies were brought from the gardens, the men standing about helplessly and depressed. As the raiding party could not have been far off, I proposed to the men to follow them up at once, and try to release the prisoners, but they were disheartened by the misfortune that so suddenly had overtaken them.
The Ngoni people celebrate a festival of first fruits known as Nc'wala in late February at Mutenguleni about 25km from Chipata.

See also
Gazaland
Mzilikazi
Nguni people
Matabele
Zulu Kingdom

References

Bibliography
Nwaezeigwe, Nwankwo. Ngoni (The Heritage Library of African Peoples)
Rau, William Eugene. Mpezeni's Ngoni of Eastern Zambia, 1870–1920, Ph.D. dissertation, 1974
Bauer, Andreus. Street of Caravans.
Iliffe, John. Modern History of Tanganyika.
The Illustrated Encyclopedia of Mankind
Reader, John. Africa, a biography of the Continent
Tew, Mary. People of the Lake Nyasa Region

External links

The revival of Malawian Chingoni, by Pascal J. Kishindo
Ngoni history in Tanzania
Ngoni People

Ethnic groups in Malawi
Ethnic groups in Tanzania
Ethnic groups in Zambia
Indigenous peoples of East Africa

eo:Ngunoj
fr:Ngoni (peuple)
sw:Wangoni
nn:Nguni
pl:Ngoni
sh:Ngoni